Jeffrey Victor Archibald  (born 2 February 1952) is a former field hockey player from New Zealand. He competed at three Summer Olympic Games, and was a member of the New Zealand men's team that won the hockey gold medal at the 1976 Montreal Olympics.

In the 1989 Queen's Birthday Honours, Archibald was appointed a Member of the Order of the British Empire, for services to hockey.

References

External links
 

1952 births
Living people
Field hockey players from Auckland
New Zealand male field hockey players
Olympic field hockey players of New Zealand
Field hockey players at the 1972 Summer Olympics
Field hockey players at the 1976 Summer Olympics
Field hockey players at the 1984 Summer Olympics
Olympic medalists in field hockey
New Zealand Members of the Order of the British Empire
Medalists at the 1976 Summer Olympics
Olympic gold medalists for New Zealand